Senator Rooney may refer to:

Fred B. Rooney (1925–2019), Pennsylvania State Senate
Tom Rooney (Illinois politician) (born 1968), Illinois State Senate